Psychrobacter phenylpyruvicus is a Gram-negative, catalase- and oxidase-positive, nonmotile bacterium of the genus Psychrobacter, which was isolated from human blood in Belgium. Psychrobacter phenylpyruvicus can cause humans infections such as endocarditis, peritonitis, and fungating lesion of the foot, but those infections caused by this bacterium are rare.

References

External links
Type strain of Psychrobacter phenylpyruvicus at BacDive -  the Bacterial Diversity Metadatabase

Moraxellaceae
Bacteria described in 1996